Ishq is an Indian 1997 Hindi-language romantic action comedy film directed by Indra Kumar. It stars Aamir Khan,  Ajay Devgan,Juhi Chawla and Kajol along with Dalip Tahil, Sadashiv Amrapurkar, Johnny Lever and Mohan Joshi in supporting roles.

Ishq released on 28 November 1997, and grossed over  worldwide, becoming the third-highest grossing film of 1997. It earned Amrapurkar a Best Villain nomination at the 43rd Filmfare Awards. The film was remade in Kannada as Snehana Preethina (2007).

Plot 
Ranjit Rai and Harbans Lal Saxena are two wealthy businessmen who despise the poor. However, Ranjit's son Ajay meets with his childhood friend Raja, a poor mechanic; while Harbans's daughter, Madhu is good friends with Kajal, who is also poor. They fix up Ajay's marriage with Madhu by getting their signatures on a marriage certificate by deceit; and send Ajay to meet Madhu at Harbans's place in Ooty. As fate would have it, Kajal and Raja follow them, resulting in Ajay falling in love with Kajal instead and Raja falling in love with Madhu. This angers the two fathers, who try to bribe Raja and Kajal into leaving Madhu and Ajay. When this doesn't work, they try to get Raja and Kajal killed. When the children realize what their fathers really did, they refuse to back down.

Eventually, the parents play a nasty trick, by making the four lovers believe that they have changed their ways and are ready for their children to marry the person they wish to. On the way to Raja and Madhu's engagement ceremony, Kajal gets kidnapped. Raja saves her from being raped and comforts her. Meanwhile, without their knowledge, photos are taken of them. The fathers then show the photos of Raja comforting Kajal at the party. Taken out of context, the photos make it look like Raja and Kajal are being intimate with each other. Kajal's uncle is also bribed to falsely testify to the fabricated illicit affair between the two. Raja and Kajal try to prove their innocence, but Ajay and Madhu, refusing to listen to them, break up with Kajal and Raja, and the fathers' plan succeed.

The situation worsens further when Ajay and Madhu think that Kajal is pregnant with Raja's child. They tell Raja and Kajal that they are getting married, which is what their fathers wanted all along. After hearing this, Kajal attempts to kill herself, but Raja stops her. Intending to teach Ajay and Madhu a lesson, Raja attacks them while they are in a car. Raja pretends to show that he is about to rape Madhu, but Ajay saves and comforts her. Raja is beaten brutally while in police custody, and Kajal pleads with the fathers to release him. The fathers agree, but on the condition that Kajal and Raja leave the country for good and that they would be killed if they ever did return. Kajal agrees and Raja is set free.

Ajay and Madhu's wedding is about to start when Ajay's uncle, Lambodar, shows them pictures of Ajay comforting Madhu after she almost got raped. This proves that Raja had attacked them to recreate the situation he and Kajal had been in, which in turn proved that Raja and Kajal are innocent and that the fathers were behind the initial attack on Kajal. Furthermore, Kajal's uncle also confesses that he lied out of bribery. Angry and heartbroken, Ajay almost chokes his father to death, but his conscience stops him. He then tries to kill himself, but Madhu stops him. Ajay and Madhu rush to the shipyard and succeed to stop Raja and Kajal from leaving the country on the ship. They ask for forgiveness and the lovers get back together. They then get to know that Ranjit delayed the ship's departure by half an hour, allowing Ajay and Madhu to meet their partners. The fathers arrive, having realized their grave mistake, and also ask for forgiveness, declaring their discovery of how poor they are in spite of wealth and that their real wealth is their children. The lovers forgive them and everyone is reunited.

Cast 
Aamir Khan as Raja Ahlawat
Ajay Devgan as Ajay Rai
Juhi Chawla as Pooja Saxena
Kajol as Kajal Sharma
Juhi Chawla as Madhu Sa

Johnny Lever as Lambodar Upadhyay
Sadashiv Amrapurkar as Ranjit Rai
Dalip Tahil as Harbans Lal Saxena
Mohan Joshi as Madan Jindal
Tiku Talsania as Pankaj Gaitonde
Anant Mahadevan as Brijesh Lal Saxena
Yunus Parvez as Parsi baba
Razzak Khan as Nawaab naadin Dhinna Change
Deepak Shirke as Damliya Kutta
Deven Verma as Behram
Ghanashyam Nayak as ACP Balram Gulati IPS
Shwetha Menon as Jia in song "Humko Tumse Pyar Hai"
Achyut Potdar as Barrister Chandra Shekhar Gokhale

Production

Development 

Director Indra Kumar had initially planned to make Ishq in 1991 with Aamir Khan and Pooja Bhatt as two of the four leads, but due to their personal problems at the time, they opted out of the film. Later, Boney Kapoor asked Kumar to make the film with Sanjay Kapoor and Vivek Mushran playing the roles of Ajay and Raja, respectively. However, Kumar had no happiness to cast the two, and he then made the film Raja (1995) with Sanjay Kapoor, which released in 1995. He again came with the idea of making Ishq in 1996 and selected Aamir Khan, Ajay Devgn, Juhi Chawla and Kajol to play the leads.

Casting 

Karisma Kapoor and Madhuri Dixit were offered the roles of Kajol and Juhi Chawla, respectively, but the former declined to work opposite Devgan and the latter had date issues. Along with this, Amitabh Bachchan was signed to play the role of a man who after completing an intermission tries to unite the four lovers, but due to some problems with Kumar, he left the film, and Kumar later removed that character from the film. Ishq was Kumar's first film to not star Madhuri Dixit as a female lead and the second movie with Aamir Khan after 1990's Dil. The film also marked the first collaboration between Kumar and Devgn.

Filming 

During the shooting of the film, Aamir Khan threw a prank on Juhi Chawla, after which she got irritated.

Reception 
Anupama Chopra wrote, "Despite fine performances it is a 70 mm melodrama". The film was a blockbuster at the box office. Its gross is equivalent to  adjusted for inflation in 2019. It became the third-highest grossing film of 1997, behind Dil To Pagal Hai and Border.

Music 
The music was composed by Anu Malik. The Ishq soundtrack album sold 3million units, making it the year's sixth best-selling Bollywood soundtrack album. The tune of the hit track "Neend Churai Meri" was copied from the Linear song "Sending All My Love". It was subsequently remade as Maine Tujhko Dekha by Malik's nephew Amaal Malik for the 2017 film Golmaal Again.

Awards

References

External links 
 

1997 films
1990s Hindi-language films
1990s buddy comedy-drama films
Films shot in Ooty
Indian buddy comedy-drama films
Films directed by Indra Kumar
Films scored by Anu Malik
Hindi films remade in other languages
Indian romantic comedy-drama films
Films shot in Mumbai
Films set in Mumbai
1997 romantic comedy-drama films
Films shot in Switzerland
Films scored by Surinder Sodhi
1997 comedy films
1997 drama films